Kalateh-ye Kachi (also Romanized as Kalāteh-ye Kāchī) is a village in Darmian Rural District, in the Central District of Darmian County, South Khorasan Province, Iran. At the 2006 census, its population was 8, in 4 families.

References 

Populated places in Darmian County